The 1986 Fujifilm Trophy was held in Frankfurt am Main. Medals were awarded in the disciplines of men's singles, ladies' singles, pair skating, and ice dancing.

Results

Men

Ladies

Pairs

Ice dancing

External links
 Skate Canada results

Fujifilm Trophy, 1986
Bofrost Cup on Ice